was a  after Kōhei and before Enkyū. This period spanned the years from August 1065 through April 1069.

Change of Era
 1065 : The new era name was created to mark an event or series of events. The previous era ended and the new one commenced in Kōhei 8, 2nd day of the 8th month of 1065.

Events of the Jiryaku Era
 April 3, 1066 (Jiryaku 2, 6th day of the 3rd month): A broom star appeared in the east at first light.
 1068 (Jiryaku 4, 14th day of the 8th month): Ceremonies for starting construction on rebuilding the Coronation Hall, which had been destroyed by fire. 
 1068 (Jiryaku 4, 19th day of the 4th month): In the 4th year of Emperor Go-Reizei's reign (後冷泉天皇4年), he died at age 44; and the succession (senso) was received by his son. Shortly thereafter, Emperor Go-Sanjo is said to have acceded to the throne (sokui).

Notes

References
 Brown, Delmer M. and Ichirō Ishida, eds. (1979).  Gukanshō: The Future and the Past. Berkeley: University of California Press. ;  OCLC 251325323
 Kitagawa, Hiroshi and Bruce T. Tsuchida. (1975). The Tale of the Heike. Tokyo: University of Tokyo Press.   OCLC 262297615
 Nussbaum, Louis-Frédéric and Käthe Roth. (2005).  Japan encyclopedia. Cambridge: Harvard University Press. ;  OCLC 58053128
 Pankenier, David W., Zhentao Xu and Yaotiao Jiang. (2008). Archaeoastronomy in East Asia: Historical Observational Records of Comets and Meteor Showers from China, Japan, and Korea. Amherst, New York: Cambria Press.  ;  OCLC 269455845
 Titsingh, Isaac. (1834). Nihon Odai Ichiran; ou,  Annales des empereurs du Japon.  Paris: Royal Asiatic Society, Oriental Translation Fund of Great Britain and Ireland. OCLC 5850691
 Varley, H. Paul. (1980). A Chronicle of Gods and Sovereigns: Jinnō Shōtōki of Kitabatake Chikafusa. New York: Columbia University Press. ;  OCLC 6042764

External links
 National Diet Library, "The Japanese Calendar" -- historical overview plus illustrative images from library's collection

Japanese eras